Gosport Road and Alverstoke railway station served the town of Gosport, Hampshire, England, from 1865 to 1915 on the Stokes Bay line.

History 
The station was opened as Stoke Road on 1 June 1865 by the Stokes Bay Railway and Pier Company. It was situated on the south side of Pier Road. The platforms were initially low, both of them having a waiting shelter. On the up platform was the ticket office. The station and platforms were rebuilt in 1885, both of them now being a standard height. The station's name was changed to Gosport Road on 8 November 1866 and changed again to Gosport Road and Alverstoke in October 1893. It closed on 1 November 1915. The station buildings were converted to housing for the station guard. The station was demolished in the 1930s and the site is now partly occupied by housing and a road.

References 

Disused railway stations in Hampshire
Former London and South Western Railway stations
Railway stations in Great Britain opened in 1865
Railway stations in Great Britain closed in 1915
1865 establishments in England
1915 disestablishments in England